Suranagi  is a village in the southern state of Karnataka, India. It is located in the Laxmeshwar taluk of Gadag district in Karnataka.

Demographics
 India census, Suranagi had a population of 6,657 with 3,415 males and 3,242 females.

See also
 Districts of Karnataka

References

External links
 http://Gadag.nic.in/

Villages in Gadag district